is a railway station operated by Hanshin Electric Railway Co., Ltd., Hankyu Corporation and Kobe Electric Railway Co., Ltd. in the district of Shinkaichi, Hyogo-ku, Kobe opened on April 7, 1968.

Kobe Rapid Transit Railway Co., Ltd. owns the railway lines, and Hanshin, Hankyu and Shintetsu operate trains running on the lines.

Shinkaichi was originally at the heart of Kobe, but Kobe's central business district has shifted towards Sannomiya.

All 3 railway lines that stop at this station are named Kobe Kosoku Line.

Lines 
Shinkaichi is served by the following railway lines and stations:

 Hanshin Railway Kōbe Kosoku Line (Tozai Line)
 Hankyū Railway Kōbe Kosoku Line (Tozai Line)
 Kobe Electric Railway Kōbe Kosoku Line (Namboku Line)

Tozai Line (Hanshin, Hankyu)

Overview 
Shinkaichi is the terminus for Hankyu services originating at Umeda Station as well as for select through services from the Kintetsu Nara Line. Services to and from the Sanyo Electric Railway Main Line and the Hanshin Main Line continue in either direction.

Select trains from the Sanyo Main Line continue instead to the Hankyu platforms at Kobe-Sannomiya Station.

Layout 
There are two island platforms with three tracks on the second basement.

Gallery

Namboku Line (Shintetsu)

Overview 
Shinkaichi is the southern terminus for all services on the Kobe Electric Railway.

Layout 
There are two dead-end platforms with three tracks on the first basement.

Gallery

History 
The station opened on 7 April 1968 for all Tozai Line and Namboku line services.

Damage to the station was caused by the Great Hanshin earthquake in 1995. Restoration work on the Tozai Line took six months to complete.

Station numbering was introduced on 1 April 2014.

References

External links 

 Hanshin Station website (in Japanese)
 Kobe Electric Railway Station timetable (in Japanese)

Railway stations in Hyōgo Prefecture
Buildings and structures in Kobe
Railway stations in Japan opened in 1968